Miroslav Škovira is a Slovak professional ice hockey player who played with HK SKP Poprad in the Slovak Extraliga during the 2010–11 season.

External links

Living people
HK Poprad players
HC Košice players
Slovak ice hockey forwards
Year of birth missing (living people)
Czechoslovak ice hockey defencemen
Slovak expatriate ice hockey players in the Czech Republic
Slovak expatriate ice hockey players in Canada
Slovak expatriate ice hockey players in Germany
Slovak expatriate sportspeople in Romania
Slovak expatriate sportspeople in Italy
Slovak expatriate sportspeople in England
Slovak expatriate sportspeople in Austria
Slovak expatriate sportspeople in France
Slovak expatriate sportspeople in Spain
Expatriate ice hockey players in Romania
Expatriate ice hockey players in Italy
Expatriate ice hockey players in England
Expatriate ice hockey players in Austria
Expatriate ice hockey players in France
Expatriate ice hockey players in Spain